Lewisohn Hall is a building on the Columbia University campus in Manhattan, New York. Completed in 1905, it was designed by Arnold W. Brunner in imitation of the other McKim, Mead & White buildings on campus, and named after banker and mining magnate Adolph Lewisohn. The building currently houses the School of General Studies and School of Professional Studies.

The Le Marteleur was formerly located in front of Lewisohn, when the building housed the School of Mines; it was relocated to the Mudd Building when the later moved there in the 1960s.

References

External links

 

Columbia University campus
University and college buildings in the United States
School buildings completed in 1905